Theo Ananissoh (born 1962) is a Togolese writer living in Germany. He studied modern literature and comparative literature at the University of Paris III: Sorbonne Nouvelle. He taught in France and Germany, where he moved in 1994.  Among his novels are Lisahoé (2005), Un reptile par habitant (2007), Ténèbres à midi (2010), and L'invitation (2013), which was published by Éditions Elyzad while he was in Tunisia.

References

Togolese writers
Togolese novelists
1962 births
Living people
University of Paris alumni
Togolese expatriates in Germany
Togolese expatriates in France
20th-century Togolese writers
21st-century Togolese writers